

History
The Tryon County Regiment was authorized on August 14, 1775 by the Province of North Carolina Congress.  It was subordinate to the Salisbury District Brigade of militia.  The regiment was engaged in battles and skirmishes against the British during the American Revolution in North Carolina, South Carolina and Tennessee between 1775 and 1778.  It was disbanded on February 8, 1779 and split into the newly created Lincoln and Rutherford County regiments.

See also
 Tryon County, North Carolina
 List of American Revolutionary War battles
 Salisbury District Brigade
 Southern Campaigns: Pension Transactions for a description of the transcription effort by Will Graves
 Southern theater of the American Revolutionary War

References

Bibliography
 
 

1775 establishments in North Carolina
North Carolina militia
Tryon County, North Carolina